João Paulo Gomes da Costa (born 1 July 1986), known as João Paulo, is a Brazilian footballer who plays as a left back for América Mineiro.

Club career

Flamengo
On 10 January 2013 Flamengo signed João Paulo on a two-year loan from Mogi Mirim.

Palmeiras
On 6 January 2015, João Paulo was signed by Palmeiras on a one-year loan deal from Desportivo Brasil.

Career statistics

Honours
Avaí
Campeonato Catarinense: 2005

Treze
Campeonato Paraibano: 2010

Flamengo
Copa do Brasil: 2013
Campeonato Carioca: 2014

Palmeiras
Copa do Brasil: 2015

References

External links

1986 births
Living people
Footballers from Rio de Janeiro (city)
Brazilian footballers
Association football defenders
Campeonato Brasileiro Série A players
Campeonato Brasileiro Série B players
Campeonato Brasileiro Série C players
Campeonato Brasileiro Série D players
Avaí FC players
Rio Claro Futebol Clube players
Esporte Clube Novo Hamburgo players
Sociedade Esportiva do Gama players
Treze Futebol Clube players
Mogi Mirim Esporte Clube players
Guarani FC players
Associação Atlética Ponte Preta players
CR Flamengo footballers
Sociedade Esportiva Palmeiras players
Esporte Clube Bahia players
Figueirense FC players
América Futebol Clube (MG) players